The River Waveney is a river which forms the boundary between Suffolk and Norfolk, England, for much of its length within The Broads. The "ey" part of the name means "river" thus the name is tautological.

Course
The source of the River Waveney is a ditch on the east side of the B1113 road between the villages of Redgrave, Suffolk and South Lopham, Norfolk. The ditch on the other side of the road is the source of the River Little Ouse which continues the county boundary and, via the Great Ouse, reaches the sea at King's Lynn. It is thus claimed that during periods of heavy rainfall Norfolk can be considered to be an island. The explanation of this oddity is that the valley in which the rivers rise was formed not by these rivers, but by water spilling from the periglacial lake known as Lake Fenland. This was a periglacial lake of the Devensian glacial period, fifteen or twenty thousand years ago. The ice sheet closed the natural drainage from the Vale of Pickering, the Humber and The Wash so that a lake of a complex shape formed in the Vale of Pickering, the Yorkshire Ouse valley, the lower Trent valley and the Fenland basin. This valley was its spillway into the southern North Sea basin, thence to the English Channel basin.

The river rises close to the  contour, and flows in an easterly direction though the towns of Diss, Bungay and Beccles. From its source it forms the southern boundary of Bressingham and Roydon before it reaches Diss.  At Scole it is crossed by the course of a Roman road, with the modern A140 bypass just to the east. There is a weir at Billingford and Billingford Windmill is situated a little to the north of the river. Beyond Billingford Bridge the River Dove, flowing northwards from Eye, joins on the southern bank, the Mid Suffolk Footpath crosses and the river drops below the  contour at another weir. It turns to the north-east to reach Brockdish and Needham before passing to the south of Harleston. There are several lakes on the south bank, the largest covering , which were once Weybread Gravel Pits, but are now used for fishing.

Below the lakes are the remains of a Cluniac priory and the extensive drained area of Mendham Marshes. Mendham, which is the birthplace of the artist Alfred Munnings, lies on the Suffolk bank, Wortwell is in Norfolk, and Homersfield is again in Suffolk. In 1869, Homersfield Bridge, one of the first bridges to be constructed from concrete and iron was built across the river here. It is now the oldest concrete bridge in England and is a Grade II* listed structure. Road traffic was diverted onto a new bridge in 1970 and the former structure was acquired by Norfolk County Council in 1994. They passed it on to the Norfolk Historic Buildings Trust, which managed its restoration in 1995, which was funded by grants from English Heritage, Blue Circle Industries and councils at county, district and local level.
Opposite Homersfield, on the Norfolk side of the river lie the parishes of Alburgh, Denton and Earsham. Next on the Suffolk bank is Flixton the site of a World War II USAF bomber base and the Norfolk and Suffolk Aviation Museum. At Earsham the Otter Trust had one of its three UK centres, which opened in 1978 and closed in 2006, having successfully boosted otter numbers on the river.

At Bungay, the historic head of navigation, the Waveney forms a wide oxbow meander, carrying with it the Norfolk/Suffolk border. Within this loop lies the long-established Bungay and Waveney Valley golf course. Next, on the Norfolk bank, come Ditchingham, Broome and Ellingham before Geldeston, where an isolated pub stands next to the site of a lock, now replaced by a sluice. This is the current limit of navigation for craft larger than a rowing or paddling boat and at this point the Waveney becomes a tidal river. A short way further along is a dyke that leads to the village. On the Suffolk side are found the parishes of Mettingham. Shipmeadow and Barsham. On the Norfolk side Gillingham comes next before the river gathers waters at Beccles, as it enters the Broads. Beccles was a fishing port for many years and the parents of Lord Nelson were married in the church of St Michael. The river then meanders past Barnby Broad and Marshes SSSI and Burgh St Peter to Somerleyton. Here Oulton Dyke branches off the Waveney to Oulton Broad towards Lowestoft. A sea lock, known as Mutford Lock, divides fresh from seawater and links Oulton Broad with Lake Lothing and the North Sea. This lock is operated by Sentinel Enterprises Limited and will allow traffic to pass through.

At Somerleyton the Lowestoft to Norwich railway line crosses the Waveney on a swing bridge, while at St Olaves, the Haddiscoe Cut branches off left to connect the Rivers Yare and Waveney. The Cut was excavated in the 19th century to provide a direct route between Lowestoft Docks and Norwich. Finally the Waveney flows past Burgh Castle into Breydon Water at the confluence of the two rivers. The river Yare continues through Breydon Water to reach the sea at Great Yarmouth.

There were also steam wherries.

Daniel Defoe enlivens this account of the Waveney's Broads course:The River Waveney is a considerable river, and of a deep and full channel, navigable for large barges as high as Beccles; it runs for a course of about fifty miles, between the two counties of Suffolk and Norfolk, as a boundary to both; and pushing on, tho' with a gentle stream, towards the sea, no one would doubt, but, that when they see the river growing broader and deeper, and going directly towards the sea, even to the edge of the beach; that is to say, within a mile of the main ocean; no stranger, I say, but would expect to see its entrance into the sea at that place, and a noble harbour for ships at the mouth of it; when on a sudden, the land rising high by the sea-side, crosses the head of the river, like a dam, checks the whole course of it, and it returns, bending its course west, for two miles, or thereabouts; and then turning north, thro' another long course of meadows (joining to those just now mention'd) seeks out the River Yare, that it may join its water with hers, and find their way to the sea together.

Navigation

The River Waverney was improved for navigation under an Act of Parliament obtained in 1670, which empowered five traders from Bungay and one from Downham Market to carry out the work. This included the construction of three locks, at Geldeston, Ellingham and Wainford, to extend navigation as far as Bungay Staithe. The navigation remained in private hands, and was not under the control of the Yarmouth Commissioners, who were responsible for the lower river. A second Act obtained in 1772 ensured that Suffolk magistrates received a 5 per cent share of all tolls obtained from the carriage of coal, with which to maintain the Waveney. Ownership was in the hands of a merchant from Bungay at the end of the eighteenth century, and was later bought by William Butcher. When St Olave's bridge needed to be rebuilt in 1847, he explained that although he owned it, he had let out the collection of tolls, and such matters were dealt with by the judges at Bury St Edmunds Assizes. In 1848, he attempted to set up the Bungay Navigation Tontine Co., which would buy the rights to levy tolls and trade on the river, using a tontine, but the scheme failed to attract sufficient investors to become viable. In 1889 ownership was transferred to W. D. Walker of Bungay, a merchant and maltster. The firm was the first owner of a wherry called Albion, now owned by the Norfolk Wherry Trust. From 1919 to 1934, Watney, Combe, Reid and Co. controlled the navigation.

The short section of the river from Haddiscoe to Burgh Ferry was part of a grand scheme to link Norwich to the sea at Lowestoft. The scheme originated in 1818, but was opposed by the merchants of Yarmouth and it was not until 28 May 1827 that an Act of Parliament authorised the Norwich and Lowestoft Navigation Company, giving then powers to raise £100,000, with an additional £50,000 if required. From Burgh Ferry, boats would use a widened Oulton Dyke to reach Oulton Broad and a new sea lock would be constructed to link the broad to Lake Lothing. Completed in 1829, it was demonstrated in 1831 and although four operations of the sluices were estimated to have removed 10,000 tons of gravel and shingle out to sea, its subsequent operation was not as effective.

In the other direction, construction of Haddiscoe Cut began, to link the river at Haddiscoe to the River Yare at Reedham, enabling vessels from Norwich to bypass Yarmouth. With funds running low, a decision was taken to borrow the additional £50,000 which the enabling Act allowed and so a request was made to the Exchequer Bill Loan Commission for this amount. Work was completed on the cut and the upgrading of the river to Norwich and the formal opening took place on 30 September 1833. The venture was a commercial failure, as development of Norwich as a port did not occur and Lowestoft harbour was subject to silting. With income failing to match expenditure, the Exchequer Bill Loan Commission could not be repaid, so they took over the navigation in 1842 and sold it to the railway contractor Sir Samuel Morton Peto.

With the decline in the use of wherries for commercial trade on the rivers prior to the Second World War, navigation ceased on several stretches of the Broads, including the  section of the river from Geldeston Lock to Bungay, where navigation rights were removed in 1934. Geldeston Lock, which is also known as Shipmeadow Lock, gradually deteriorated, and in 2013 it was restored in a joint project by the River Waveney Trust and the Inland Waterways Association. During the restoration work, a carved stone showing that the lock was previously restored in 1910 was found, as was a gold wedding ring. Wainford and Ellingham locks have since been converted into sluices, but the Environment Agency has negotiated with local landowners to allow the use of this section by canoes and unpowered craft. To aid this, it has improved the facilities for portaging boats at the locks.

Mutford lock links Oulton Broad to Lake Lothing and is the only working lock on the whole of the Broads. Two swing bridges carried the Lowestoft to Ipswich railway line and the A1117 road over the cut to the east of the lock. The road bridge has since been replaced with a single leaf bascule bridge in August 1992. The lock was refurbished in 1992 and was managed by Waveney District Council, but there were discussions taking place in 2009 to transfer it to the Broads Authority, who manage the rest of the Broads. Since 2011, day-to-day management has been handled on behalf of the council by Sentinel Enterprises, which is part of Sentinel Leisure Trust. They also operate Oulton Broad Yacht Station.

Milling
Despite these factors, the river has powered at least 15 mills, evidence for some of which indicates that the river has been used for this purpose for over 900 years. Most milled corn for flour or animal feed, but some were used for other purposes. Of those that remain, all are in private ownership.

The mill furthest upstream was Scole Flax Mill, although it was not a watermill, being powered by steam. It was built by C.F. Costerton in 1854, in an attempt to alleviate poverty during the agricultural depressions of the 1840s, which followed the cessation of war with France. He persuaded farmers to grow flax, and provided the facilities to process it, both at the mill and at a factory in Eye run by his business partner Peter Naylor. The flax was grown for its fibres, which were used to make linen sheeting, sacking and rope, and for its seeds, from which linseed oil was obtained. With the mill affected by a decline in local supplies and overseas competition, it closed in 1881, after which the machinery was removed and the buildings demolished.

The first watermill was at Hoxne. The present building was erected in 1846, and consists of a brick ground floor, with two storeys above that which are timber framed and weatherboarded, and a slate roof. It replaced a structure built in 1749, but that was not the first mill at Hoxne, since a mill is shown on Kirby's map of Suffolk, dated 1736, and two mills are mentioned in the Domesday Book of 1086, although this probably meant that there were two sets of stones. The last two buildings were variously used for milling corn, the production of textiles, and for processing flax at different points in their history. The mill ceased to be used after it was sold in 1968, but retains its wheel and some of the machinery. Both the mill and the adjacent house are grade II listed structures.

Syleham Mill is first mentioned in connection with some monks from near Thetford, who founded a monastery in 1020. The final structure to occupy the site was built some time after 1779. Initially it had six sets of stones and two wheels, powered by a  fall in the river, but in 1849, Henry Warne moved his business from Hoxne Mill to Syleham, and used the mill to power looms on which a coarse cloth made from linen and cotton called drabbet was woven. 96 people were employed there in 1855, but although manufacture of drabbet ceased in 1914, the adjacent factory continued to be used for the making of clothing. The mill and part of the factory were destroyed by fire in 1928, but the factory was rebuilt, and continued to produce men's garments until 1989, when it was closed with the loss of 100 jobs. The next mill was Luck's Mill, about which very little is known, but it was shown on Kirby's map of 1736, and was demolished in the 1880s or 1890s.

Needham Mill also had ecclesiastical connections, as it was owned by Sibson Abbey, a Cistercian abbey founded in 1150. It was sold in 1611, and appears on Kirby's map of 1736. Although known as Needham Mill, it is on the Suffolk side of the river, in the parish of Weybread. Milling continued until 1934, when the mill was sold. The ironwork and wheel were sold for scrap in 1940, and it was converted into a house in 1971. The weir and sluice were rebuilt in 1963 at a cost of £12,714. The work created a gauging station for flow measurement, and increased the capacity of the channels to reduce the risk of flooding. Weybread mill is also noted in the Domesday survey. Both Needham and Weybread were run by William Mann in 1779, and Weybread mill was run by a miller and baker called Jacob Stanton from 1785. He became bankrupt in 1794, and the sale details indicate that there were two wheels driving five pairs of stones, and a newly invented water-powered engine for cutting hay and straw. It had five storeys, and sold for £1,250, but burnt down two years later and was not rebuilt.

The machinery was modernised in 1905, when the number of stones was reduced from nine to four, to make way for a roller plant. The beam engine was replaced in 1923, having been driven and maintained for over 50 years by Jimmy Souter. During this time it never broke down, and Souter died once it was dismantled. It was replaced by a Lister diesel engine, and then a Ruston and Hornsby engine. Part of the building was converted into a house in 1938, and the mill continued to operate until 1949. The rights to use the water were given up in the 1950s, in exchange for the provision of mains electricity to the premises. Both the mill and the house are grade II listed. There may also have been a paper mill at Mendham, but the evidence is inconclusive.

Limbourne Mill in Wortwell is mentioned in the Domesday Book, and was owned by the Benedictine Nunnery at Bungay. It appears in documents from 1334, 1356 and 1364, and in 1846 it was noted in a history of Suffolk that Limbourne would be unknown were it not for the water mill, which was called Limber Mill at the time. It continued in use until at least 1933, but was unused by 1949. Some of the original machinery survives, and the mill is grade II listed. Homersfield Mill is attested in 1086 and by documents from every century from the fourteenth onwards. The river bank by the weir collapsed in the early 1920s, and was not repaired, resulting in the mill and cottage deteriorating and being demolished in 1927.

Water quality
The Environment Agency measures the water quality of the river systems in England. Each is given an overall ecological status, which may be one of five levels: high, good, moderate, poor and bad. There are several components that are used to determine this, including biological status, which looks at the quantity and varieties of invertebrates, angiosperms and fish. Chemical status, which compares the concentrations of various chemicals against known safe concentrations, is rated good or fail.

The water quality of the River Waveney system was as follows in 2019.

The reasons for the quality being less than good include sewage discharge affecting most of the river, physical modification of channels, and poor management of agricultural and rural land adjacent to the river system.

Location

See also
 Rivers of the United Kingdom

References

Notes

Bibliography

Gallery of crossings

External links
 River Waveney Literary Links

Norfolk Broads
Waveney
Waveney
1Waveney
Suffolk Broads
River navigations in the United Kingdom